Adelaide was a wooden cutter used in the cedar trade that was wrecked and lost off the Hawkesbury River in Broken Bay, New South Wales, in July 1837 while carrying a load of cedar. The wreck has not been located, but a vessel of its description was reported capsized between Cabbage Tree Bay and Bird Island at approximately 33.6°S 151.3°E.

References

Further reading
Online Databases
Australian Shipping - Arrivals and Departures 1788-1968 including shipwrecks 
Encyclopedia of Australian Shipwrecks - New South Wales Shipwrecks 

Books
Wrecks on the New South Wales Coast. By Loney, J. K. (Jack Kenneth), 1925–1995 Oceans Enterprises. 1993 .
Australian Shipwrecks - vol1 1622-1850, Charles Bateson, AH and AW Reed, Sydney, 1972, Call number 910.4530994 BAT
Australian shipwrecks Vol. 2 1851–1871 By Loney, J. K. (Jack Kenneth), 1925–1995. Sydney. Reed, 1980 910.4530994 LON
Australian shipwrecks Vol. 3 1871–1900 By Loney, J. K. (Jack Kenneth), 1925–1995. Geelong Vic: List Publishing, 1982 910.4530994 LON
Australian shipwrecks Vol. 4 1901–1986 By Loney, J. K. (Jack Kenneth), 1925–1995. Portarlington Vic. Marine History Publications, 1987 910.4530994 LON
Australian shipwrecks Vol. 5 Update 1986 By Loney, J. K. (Jack Kenneth), 1925–1995. Portarlington Vic. Marine History Publications, 1991 910.4530994 LON

Shipwrecks of the Northern Sydney Region
Maritime incidents in July 1837
1788–1850 ships of Australia
Merchant ships of Australia
Cutters of Australia
19th-century ships